Mayda is a non-existent island in the North Atlantic Ocean. 

Mayda may also refer to:

Mayda Insula, an insula (island) in the Kraken Mare on Titan, the largest moon of Saturn, named after the imaginary island
Mayda, an 1883 novel by Srpouhi Dussap, the first novel written by an Armenian woman
Mayda Munny, a character in Richie Rich comics
Mayda Navarro, a Mexican who competed in figure skating at the 1992 Winter Olympics
Mayda Royero, screenwriter for the 1990 Cuban film Hello Hemingway

See also
Maida (disambiguation)